Marriott School is a historic school building located near St. Stephens Church, King and Queen County, Virginia. The original section was built in 1938, and is a one-story, five bay, brick structure, flanked by a pair of four-bay wings in the Colonial Revival style. The front entrance is flanked by Doric order pilasters supporting a triangular entablature, the pediment of which is stuccoed. An addition was built in 1959.  The school closed in 1992, and subsequently housed the King & Queen Branch of the Pamunkey Regional Library.  The library moved to a new location in 2001.

It was listed on the National Register of Historic Places in 2007.

References

School buildings on the National Register of Historic Places in Virginia
Colonial Revival architecture in Virginia
School buildings completed in 1938
Buildings and structures in King and Queen County, Virginia
Defunct schools in Virginia
National Register of Historic Places in King and Queen County, Virginia